CFNS was a Canadian radio station that broadcast in Saskatoon, Saskatchewan from 1952 to 1973. A private affiliate of Radio-Canada, it was owned by Radio-Prairies-Nord Ltée, and was the fourth French-language radio station in western Canada.

CFNS originally aired at 1170 AM and broadcast with 1,000 watts. It and CFRG in Gravelbourg were purchased by Radio-Canada in 1973 to become a rebroadcaster of Regina's new CBKF-FM. In 1975, the Canadian Radio-Television Commission (CRTC) approved CFNS to relocate to 860 kHz, change transmitter sites, and increase its power to 10,000 watts. The transmitter, which now has the call sign CBKF-2, still operates as a rebroadcaster of CBKF.

References

External links
 
 

FNS
FNS
FNS
Radio stations established in 1952
1952 establishments in Saskatchewan
Radio stations disestablished in 1973
1973 disestablishments in Saskatchewan
FNS